Robert Franco may refer to:

 Robert J. Franco (fl. 1980–1996), film set designer
 Robert Franco (skier) or Robby Franco (born 1993), American-Mexican freestyle skier

See also
 Robert Franks (disambiguation)
 Robert Frank (disambiguation)